Francis H. Rankin Jr. (December 28, 1854 – December 7, 1925) was a Michigan politician and publisher.

Early life
On December 28, 1854, Rankin was born in Flint, Michigan to Arabella and Francis H. Rankin Sr. He was educated by attending the ward schools until the age of thirteen when he went to work for his father's newspaper, the Wolverine Citizen. He was a co-owner of the paper with his father in 1881. On October 21 of that same year, Rankin married Caroline Pierce, daughter of Silas Pierce.

Political life
In 1881, he was appointed to fill the vacancy in the office of Treasurer of the City of Flint under Mayor Charles A. Mason and serving another full term under Mayor George E. Newell.  Rankin was elected as the Mayor of City of Flint in 1891 for a single 1-year term. Additional he was Secretary of the Republican County Committee for six years.

Post-political life
He served in a few organization as officers with the Genesee County Agricultural Society as secretary and with the Flint Gentleman's Driving Club as Vice President On December 7, 1925 in Flint, Michigan, Rankin died and was later buried in Glenwood Cemetery, Flint, Michigan.

References

1854 births
1925 deaths
Mayors of Flint, Michigan
Burials at Glenwood Cemetery (Flint, Michigan)
19th-century American politicians